Ellesmere was a parliamentary electorate in the Canterbury region of New Zealand. It existed for two periods between 1861 and 1928 and was represented by six Members of Parliament.

Population centres
Ellesmere was a rural electorate, with the locality Ellesmere having given it its name. It was created in the 1860 Electoral Redistribution and was used in its initial form for the 1861 election. It was located on Banks Peninsula and included Sumner, Ferrymead, settlements around Lyttelton Harbour excluding Lyttelton itself (which had its own electorate).

The electorate was abolished between 1866 and 1890. In December 1887, the House of Representatives voted to reduce its membership from general electorates from 91 to 70. The 1890 electoral redistribution used the same 1886 census data used for the 1887 electoral redistribution. In addition, three-member electorates were introduced in the four main centres. This resulted in a major restructuring of electorates, and Ellesmere was one of eight electorates to be re-created for the 1890 election. In the east, it covered most of Lake Ellesmere, but excluded Kaitorete Spit. In the west, it stopped short of the Ashburton River and did not include Ashburton itself. It went as far inland as the headwaters of the Rakaia River. Southbridge, Rakaia, Leeston, and Methven fell into the electorate.

It replaced the Akaroa electorate and thus covered all of Banks Peninsula including the town of Akaroa, plus the settlements of Governors Bay and Rapaki. A small area of land around Lake Ellesmere also belonged to the electorate, and this now included Kaitorete Spit. Southbridge and Leeston remained in the electorate (just), but all the hinterland (including Rakaia and Methven) was lost to the Selwyn and Ashburton electorates.

The 1896 Electoral Redistribution, which took effect that year, established the electorate's area for the next six years. Boundary changes were slight, with the southern settlements along Lyttelton Harbour going to the Lyttelton electorate. The 1902 Electoral Redistribution, which took effect that year, established the electorate's area until 1908. Boundary changes were again minimal, with the electorate regaining the southern settlements along Lyttelton Harbour.

The Lyttelton electorate took some area of the peninsula, and Port Levy went to that electorate.

This lost settlements like Pigeon Bay and Okains Bay.

Three quarters of Banks Peninsula, including the town of Akaroa, were now covered by the Lyttelton electorate. The Ellesmere electorate went across the Main South railway and extended all the way to the boundary between Canterbury and the West Coast, with Arthur's Pass and Harper's Pass located on that boundary. This brought many small communities on the Canterbury Plains into the electorate, including Springfield, plus settlement in the Southern Alps like Arthur's Pass and Cass.

The 1922 Electoral Redistribution, which took effect that year, established the electorate's area for its final six years. Near the coast, the boundary shifted south and Rakaia was gained again. In its final shape, the inland part of the electorate was centred on the Rakaia River. Lake Coleridge was for the first time within the electorate, and Methven was gained again.

History
Ellesmere was first established for the 1861 election. At the next election in 1866, it was replaced with the Mount Herbert electorate. It was re-established for the 1890 election and existed until 1928.

Thomas Rowley was elected unopposed on 25 January 1861. He resigned on 25 April 1862. James FitzGerald won the resulting by-election until the electorate was abolished in 1866; FitzGerald successfully stood in  instead.

John Hall, who had previously represented the Selwyn electorate, won the  against John McLachlan. These were to be Hall's final three years in Parliament before he retired, during which he achieved his "last political triumph" of successful parliamentary leadership of the women's suffrage campaign.

In , Montgomery was challenged by Frederick Arthur Anson, a sheep farmer from Peraki standing for the opposition.

Rhodes, a conservative politician who joined the Reform Party, was to hold the electorate until 1925, when he retired on medical advice, only to be promptly appointed to the Legislative Council.

Members of Parliament
The electorate was represented by six Members of Parliament.

Key

Election results

1925 election

1919 election

1899 election

1893 election

1890 election

Notes

References

Historical electorates of New Zealand
1860 establishments in New Zealand
1928 disestablishments in New Zealand
1866 disestablishments in New Zealand
1890 establishments in New Zealand